Gateway Setup Assistant is a tool in Apple Computer's Mac OS X Server versions 10.4 and higher that guides users through setting up Mac OS X Server as an internet gateway.

The Gateway Setup Assistant assumes two network interfaces and will automatically configure the DHCP, NAT, firewall, DNS, and VPN services.

External links
Apple Product page
Apple documentation PDF

MacOS Server